Two United States Senate elections (a regular and a special election) were held in Illinois on March 26, 1913. The two elections were interconnected through a compromise made to elect a Democrat in the regular election and a Republican in the special election.

These were the last elections to U.S. Senate from Illinois to take place by vote of state legislature, as the Seventeenth Amendment to the United States Constitution would make all subsequent U.S. Senate elections conducted by a popular vote.

The elections saw the election of Democrat J. Hamilton Lewis to a full term in the state's class 2 United States Senate seat in a regular election, and Republican Lawrence Y. Sherman to the state's class 3 United States Senate seat in a special election.

Background and procedure
At the time, since the Seventeenth Amendment to the United States Constitution was yet to take effect, U.S. Senate seats were filled by votes of state legislatures.

In the November 1912 state elections, the Republicans lost control of the Illinois General Assembly due to the Republican / Progressive split. But while the Democrats held a plurality of the Illinois General Assembly, they did not have a majority. The General Assembly took up the matter of electing the senators on February 1. The General Assembly therefore failed to elect until after the new congress began.

On March 26, in a compromise arranged by governor Dunne, the General Assembly elected Democrat J. Hamilton Lewis to fill the full-term seat and Republican Lawrence Y. Sherman to fill the two remaining years of a vacancy that had just recently opened. This broke a deadlock on the matter that had been in place since February 11.

Party primaries
Non-binding preference primaries were held April 9, 1912, which informed the legislature of the preferred candidate of the voters that participated in each party's primaries. They coincided with binding primaries held for other offices.

While the party was eligible to hold a primary, no Socialist primary was held for the office of U.S. Senator.

Democratic primary

Candidate
J. Hamilton Lewis, former at-large U.S. congressman from Washington

Result

Republican primary

Candidates
Shelby Moore Cullom, incumbent senator and former governor of Illinois
Lawrence Yates Sherman, former lieutenant governor of Illinois and former speaker of the Illinois House of Representatives
Hugh S. Magill, Illinois state senator

Result

Prohibition primary

Candidate
 Alonzo Wilson, former member of the Illinois House of Representatives

Result

Regular election (class 2 seat)

On April 12, 1912, five-term Republican incumbent Shelby Moore Cullom lost renomination to Lieutenant Governor of Illinois Lawrence Y. Sherman in the Republican "advisory" primary, where the voters expressed their preference for senator but the decision was not binding on the General Assembly, which made the actual choice. Cullom had suffered politically over his support for the other Illinois senator, William Lorimer, who was embroiled in a scandal over alleged bribery in his 1909 election to the Senate. After his defeat, Cullom withdrew his name from consideration by the General Assembly.

The Illinois General Assembly eventually elected the Democratic nominee, Congressman J. Hamilton Lewis March 26, 1913, who had previously won the Democratic advisory primary as the sole candidate on the ballot. Before their conclusive March 26 vote, after a compromise was stricken, the Illinois legislature had twelve-times cast deadlocked ballots for the class 2 senate seat.

Special election (class 3 seat)

In July 1912, the U.S. Senate invalidated William Lorimer's 1909 election and declared the seat vacant. The Illinois Attorney General, William H. Stead determined that the General Assembly had failed to properly elect Lorimer in 1909 and so the governor could not appoint a replacement. As a result, the General Assembly had a second Senate seat to fill.

Lawrence Y. Sherman, who had won the Republican advisory primary for Illinois’ regular senate election, was elected in the special election.

See also
 1912 and 1913 United States Senate elections

References

Bibliography
 

1913
Illinois
United States Senate
Illinois 1913
Illinois 1913
United States Senate 1913